Sally Ann Timms (born 29 November 1959) is an English singer and lyricist. Timms is best known for her long involvement with The Mekons whom she joined in 1985.

Career
Born in Leeds, in 1959, Timms recorded her first solo album, Hangahar (an experimental improvised film score), at the age of 19 with Pete Shelley of Buzzcocks in 1980. Prior to joining The Mekons in 1986 she was in a band called the She Hees. She has released several other solo albums, Someone's Rocking My Dreamboat in 1988, To the Land of Milk and Honey in 1995, and a country album, Cowboy Sally's Twilight Laments for Lost Buckaroos, for Bloodshot Records in 1998. She gave herself the name "Cowboy Sally" after the character she played on TNT's Rudy and GoGo Show. Her solo recording In the World of Him was released in 2004 on Touch and Go Records.

Timms sang "Give Me Back my Dreams" on The Sixths' Hyacinths and Thistles and has recorded with Marc Almond, The Aluminum Group, Jon Rauhouse's Steel Guitar Show, the Sadies, Andre Williams, and A Grape Dope. She participated in Vito Acconci's Theater Project for a Rock Band as part of the Brooklyn Academy of Music's Next Wave Festival in 1995 and also, along with the rest of The Mekons, performed with Kathy Acker in her lesbian pirate operetta Pussy, King of the Pirates at the Museum of Contemporary Art in Chicago and elsewhere. Timms sang several songs on the Pine Valley Cosmonauts' The Executioner's Last Songs albums, which raised funds for the Illinois Moratorium Against the Death Penalty, and participated in fellow Mekon Jon Langford's multi-media performance project The Executioner's Last Songs. She co-wrote the song 'Horses', which was recorded by herself and Jon Langford on Songs of False Hope and High Values; by Palace Music, a.k.a. Bonnie Prince Billy; and by Chlorine.

Timms' musical style is often placed under the genre of alternative country, and she has often toured with other bands on Bloodshot Records.

Timms occasionally writes crude broadsheets on pop culture. She was the voice of SARA from Cartoon Network's Toonami block, voicing the first incarnation of the character from 1999 to 2004 alongside Steven Blum, the voice of TOM. In 2006(?) Timms directed the first of the five Christmas pantos hosted by the Hideout bar in Chicago, and performed in several of them.

For many years Timms has lived in the Chicago, Illinois, where she also works as a paralegal. She was married to musician and comedian Fred Armisen from 1998 to 2004.

The Mekons 

Timms joined The Mekons in the mid-1980s. A documentary titled The Revenge of the Mekons was released in 2014 by director Joe Angio. The Mekons, still including Timms on vocals, continue to record and perform live, as of 2021.

Wee Hairy Beasties 

Wee Hairy Beasties were a children's music group based in Chicago, composed of Jon Langford, Sally Timms, Kelly Hogan, and Devil in a Woodpile. They played their first gig together at the Brookfield Zoo near Chicago, and released two albums in 2006 and 2008.  Timms performed under the moniker Monkey Double Dippey.

Solo, etc. 
Timms and Jon Langford, the other Chicago-based member of the Mekons, continue to collaborate on various recording and performance projects, ever since they both moved to Chicago.  As of 2022, they frequently perform as a duo, and as a trio with a second guitarist, often at Chicago's Hideout.

Solo discography
 1980 – Hangahar
 1988 – Somebody's Rockin' My Dreamboat
 1995 – It Says Here
 1995 – To the Land of Milk and Honey
 1997 – Cowboy Sally
 1999 – Cowboy Sally's Twilight Laments for Lost Buckaroos
 2000 – Songs of False Hope and High Values (with Jon Langford)
 2004 – In the World of Him

Compilation contributions 

 2000: "Glue" by Andre Williams/V. Rice/O.M. Hayes) – Down to the Promised Land: 5 Years of Bloodshot Records – as Andre Williams & Sally Timms
 2005: "Tumbling Tumbleweeds" – For A Decade of Sin: 11 Years of Bloodshot Records
 2007: "Junco Partner" and "Version Pardner" – The Sandinista! Project – A Tribute to The Clash – Jon Langford and Sally Timms with Ship & Pilot (00:02:59 Records/MRI Associated Labels)
 2014: "Mole Lotta Love", with Bobcat Goldthwait – 2776, the charity comedy album

References

External links

 Sally Timms page at Club Mekon
 Sally Timms collection at the Internet Archive's live music archive

1959 births
Living people
English women singers
English country singer-songwriters
English alternative country singers
Musicians from Leeds
Bloodshot Records artists
The Mekons members
Pigface members